Dan'l Druce, Blacksmith is a play by W. S. Gilbert, styled "A Three-Act Drama of Puritan times". It opened at the Haymarket Theatre in London on 11 September 1876, starring Hermann Vezin, Johnston Forbes-Robertson and Marion Terry. The play was a success, running for about 100 performances and enjoying tours and several revivals. It was popular enough to be burlesqued in a contemporary work, Dan'l Tra-Duced, Tinker, at the Strand Theatre.  In an 1894 revival, Nancy McIntosh played Dorothy.

The text notes that "An incident in the First Act was suggested by George Eliot's Novel Silas Marner".

Background
Gilbert and Sullivan had already produced their hit one-act comic opera Trial by Jury by the time Dan'l Druce was written, but both Gilbert and Arthur Sullivan were still producing a considerable amount of work separately. The comic actor Edward Sothern had contacted Gilbert, in April 1875, noting that he was taking over the management of the Haymarket Theatre and needed a play for December, though Sothern did not plan to appear in the play. Gilbert was unable to complete the play on time and asked for an extension. Sothern then left to go on tour in America and wrote to Gilbert to be ready with another play by October, this time to feature him in a serious role. That play, The Ne'er-do-Weel, was also late and did not open until 1878. Hermann Vezin took the title role in Dan'l Druce in a cast featuring Johnston Forbes-Robertson and the 19-year-old Marion Terry as Dorothy.

The title character was originally called Jonas Marple, but Gilbert changed the name to one less closely identifiable with George Eliot's Silas Marner (published in 1861), first to Abel Druce and then to Dan'l Druce. He also changed the character's occupation from weaver to blacksmith, and altered Eliot's story to make Druce the true father of the child who is left at his house in place of his stolen gold. Bits of Dan'l Druce would echo in later operas. For instance, one of Reuben's speeches, beginning "I will so coll thee, coax thee, cosset thee, court thee, cajole thee, with deftly turned compliment, pleasant whimsy, delicate jest and tuneful madrigal" has similarities with Jack Point's speech in Act II of The Yeomen of the Guard. Elements of the characters of Dorothy and Geoffrey are later seen in Rose Maybud and Richard Dauntless in Ruddigore. The play ran for 119 performances and enjoyed tours in Britain and America and revivals, achieving reasonable popularity, and even gaining a burlesque parody, Dan'l Tra-Duced, Tinker, by Arthur Clements.

Synopsis

Dan'l is a miser and a drunkard whose wife has eloped. Two deserters from the Battle of Worcester seek shelter at his house. They send him to buy food and steal his money, then run off, leaving at his cottage a baby girl with a note that says that his gold has taken the form of the baby. Fourteen years later, Dan'l is a blacksmith. The villains return, but Dan'l does not want to surrender the now-teenaged girl. Ultimately, she stays with Dan'l and marries her young sweetheart. In the words of a review from the Illustrated London News of 16 September 1876:

Roles and original cast
Sir Jasper Combe, a Royalist Colonel – Mr. Howe
Dan'l Druce – Hermann Vezin
Reuben Haines, a Royalist Sergeant – Mr. Odell
Geoffrey Wynyard, a Merchant Sailor – Johnston Forbes-Robertson
Marple – Mr. Braid
Joe Ripley, a Fisherman – Mr. Weathersby
Sergeant of the Parliamentary Army – C. Allbrook
Soldier of the Parliamentary Army – Mr. Fielder
Dorothy – Marion Terry

Critical response
The audience was enthusiastic, and the critics generally gave the piece, and particularly Vezin and Terry, a warm reception. According to the Illustrated London News of 16 September 1876:

A London-based French critic described the piece as "", and The Theatre called the story "pure and true and elevated". However, when George Eliot attended a performance of the play shortly after the opening night, her husband recorded in his diary, "Wretched stuff, poorly acted". The author Walter Sichel commented that Gilbert himself would have laughed at the play, had it not been his own: "It tends occasionally to touch on the genre which Gilbert so often satirised."

Notes

References
 
 
Knapp, Shoshana, "George Eliot and W. S. Gilbert: Silas Marner Into Dan'l Druce" in Nineteenth-Century Fiction, Vol. 40, No. 4 (March 1986), pp. 438–59. (Online here- requires subscription)
 
 The Illustrated London News of 16 September 1876, page 275, column 1.
Dan'l Druce at the G&S Archive

External links

 Dan'l Druce, Blacksmith text scan at Internet Archive
 
Crowther, Andrew, "Hunchbacks, Misanthropes and Outsiders: Gilbert's Self-Image"
The cover of a theatre programme from the original production
Review of the play in The Times, 14 September 1876

Plays by W. S. Gilbert
1876 plays